This was the first edition of the tournament.

Agustín Velotti won the title after defeating André Ghem 6–0, 6–4 in the final.

Seeds

Draw

Finals

Top half

Bottom half

References
Main Draw
Qualifying Draw

Curitiba Challenger - Singles